In The Mud is the second studio album by the American bluegrass band Split Lip Rayfield, released in 1999 (see 1999 in music).

It was the first album to include mandolin player Wayne Gottstine.

Critical reception
The Austin Chronicle wrote: "High-lonesome vocal harmonies and traditional instrumentation (except the trademark bass made from an auto gas tank) nominally bring this band under the 'bluegrass' category, but the ferocity of the playing and desperation of the lyrics would have Bill Monroe spinning in his grave like a chicken on a spit."

Track listing
All songs written by Kirk Rundstrom except where noted.
 "13" – 2:09
 "Wrong" – 2:26
 "All I Got" (Gottstine) – 2:23
 "In The Ground" (Mardis) – 2:39
 "Family" – 2:24
 "Devil" – 3:05
 "Easy Street" (M. Montgomert, E. Montgomery; BMI) – 2:06
 "Trouble" – 3:46
 "3.2 Flu" (Gottstine) – 2:11
 "Glory of the Sun" – 2:00
 "Drinkin' Around" (Gottstine) – 1:21
 "Hounds" (Mardis) – 3:12
 "Strong" – 1:57
 "Tennessee" – 2:17
 "John" – 2:01
 "Truckin' Song" (Gottstine) – 1:59

Personnel
Kirk Rundstrom    -  Guitar, Vocals, (Mandolin on "Glory")
Jeff Eaton -  Gas Tank Bass, Vocals
Eric Mardis   -  Banjo, Dobro, Vocals
Wayne Gottstine  -  Mandolin, Vocals, (Guitar on "Wrong," "Glory," and "Drinkin")

References

1999 albums
Split Lip Rayfield albums
Bloodshot Records albums